French Concert is a live album by the Shelly Manne Quartet featuring Lee Konitz, recorded in Paris by Radio France as part of George Wein's Newport Jazz Festival tour in 1977, and released on the Galaxy label in 1979.

Critical reception

Scott Yanow, writing for AllMusic, commented: "This combination of jazzmen works quite well, resulting in music that is both swinging and explorative".

Track listing 
 "Softly, as in a Morning Sunrise" (Sigmund Romberg, Oscar Hammerstein II) – 9:33
 "Body and Soul" (Johnny Green, Edward Heyman, Robert Sour, Frank Eyton) – 6:30
 "What Is This Thing Called Love?" (Cole Porter) – 6:48
 "What's New?" (Bob Haggart, Johnny Burke) – 8:48
 "Stella by Starlight" (Victor Young, Ned Washington) – 5:38
 "Take the Coltrane" (Duke Ellington) – 4:00

Personnel 
Performances on Specific Tracks based on the Jazz Disco website
 Shelly Manne – drums (All Tracks)
 Lee Konitz – alto saxophone (3-6)
 Mike Wofford – piano (All Tracks)
 Chuck Domanico – bass (All Tracks)

References 

1979 live albums
Shelly Manne live albums
Lee Konitz live albums
Galaxy Records live albums